The Long Island Marathon is an annual marathon foot-race run on Long Island, New York, United States. The  event was first run in 1970 as The Earth Day Marathon. Originally the race consisted of loops around Roosevelt Raceway and Eisenhower Park in East Meadow, New York.

The event was renamed the Long Island Marathon in 1978 and a half marathon was added in 1984.

Over the years, there were several courses with the current one now starting on Charles Lindbergh Boulevard in Uniondale and finishing at Eisenhower Park in East Meadow. Part of the course runs along the Wantagh State Parkway. The Long Island Marathon record  of 2:19:53 was set by Lou Calvano in 1979.

External links
Long Island Marathon
Findamarathon.com - Long Island Marathon

Marathons in the United States
Sports in Long Island
1970 establishments in New York (state)
Recurring sporting events established in 1970